Public Bank Berhad is a bank based in Kuala Lumpur, Malaysia, offering financial services in Malaysia as well as the Asia-Pacific region.

The bank was founded in 1966 by Teh Hong Piow, the then general manager of Malayan Banking. The bank was listed on the Malaysian Stock Exchange in 1967.

Public Bank is currently one of the largest banks in Southeast Asia, with over RM 363.76 billion (US$91.26 billion) of assets and RM71.90 billion (US$18.04 billion) in market capitalization in 2015.

Public Bank is the largest bank in Malaysia by shareholders' funds, second largest by market capitalization, just behind Maybank and third largest by total assets, behind Maybank and CIMB.

Public Bank currently offers a comprehensive range of financial products and services which include personal banking, commercial banking, Islamic banking, investment banking, share broking, trustee services, nominee services, sale and management of unit trust funds, bancassurance and general insurance products. Public Bank's strategy is centered on growth in the retail banking business particularly on the retail consumers and small and medium enterprises ("SMEs").

Operations
The Public Bank Group is well known for its strong financial performance and consistent prudent management. It is consistently accorded with strong credit and financial ratings from local and foreign rating agencies. Public Bank gained a long-term rating of AAA the Rating Agency Malaysia. It is the highest rating accorded by Rating Agency Malaysia. It also received a short-term rating of P1 with stable outlook. Standard & Poor's reaffirmed Public Bank's A- long-term rating and A-2 short-term counterparty credit rating with stable outlook. Moody's Investors Service reaffirmed Public Bank's foreign currency long-term deposit rating of A3 and short-term deposit rating of P-2 with stable outlook.

Public Bank currently has a network of 259 branches and over 2000 self terminals in Malaysia. The company also has its presence in the Asia-Pacific region with a network of 1 subsidiary in Hong Kong (Public Bank (Hong Kong) Limited, with 79 branches), 1 subsidiary in Cambodia (Cambodian Public Bank Plc, with 30 branches), 1 subsidiary in Vietnam (Public Bank Vietnam Limited, with 12 branches), 4 branches in Laos, 3 branches in China and 3 branches in Sri Lanka.

In total, the company serves more than 9 million customers in countries where it operates.

Subsidiaries

Malaysia
Public Islamic Bank 
Public Investment Bank 
Public Mutual Berhad
Public Bank (Labuan)
PB Trustee Services

Hong Kong
Public Bank (Hong Kong) Limited
Public Finance Limited
Winton (B.V.I.) Limited

Cambodia
Cambodian Public Bank Plc
Campu Lonpac Insurance Plc
Campu Securities Plc

Vietnam
Public Bank Vietnam Limited

See also 
 Public Bank (Hong Kong)
List of largest Malaysian banks
List of largest banks in Southeast Asia

References

External links
 

1966 establishments in Malaysia
Banks of Cambodia
Banks of Malaysia
Companies listed on Bursa Malaysia
Banks established in 1966
1960s initial public offerings